Love is a 2011 American science fiction drama film produced and scored by the alternative rock band Angels & Airwaves. The film is the directorial debut of filmmaker William Eubank. The film's world premiere took place on February 2, 2011, at the 26th Annual Santa Barbara International Film Festival and the film was later featured in the Seattle International Film Festival, FanTasia 2011, and a number of other festivals around the world. The film was screened in 460 theatres across the United States on August 10, 2011, in the Love Live event.

Love portrays the personal-psychological effects of isolation and loneliness when an astronaut becomes stranded in space and through this, emphasizes the importance of human connection and love. Additionally, it touches on the fragility of humanity's existence (explored through a dying Earth-apocalyptic doomsday scenario) inspired by the cautions of Carl Sagan in Pale Blue Dot and considers the importance of memories and stories as humanity's legacy.

Plot
During an 1864 battle of the American Civil War, a lone Union soldier, Captain Lee Briggs (Bradley Horne), is dispatched on a mission to investigate a mysterious object reported to Union forces. He leaves to venture on the mission.

175 years later, in the year 2039, United States Astronaut Lee Miller (Gunner Wright) is sent to the International Space Station (ISS) as a one-man skeleton crew to examine if it is safe for use and to perform necessary modifications after it had been abandoned two decades earlier for unknown reasons. Shortly after arriving on board, tumultuous events break out on Earth, eventually resulting in Miller losing contact with CAPCOM and finding himself stranded in orbit alone, forced to helplessly watch events on Earth from portholes 200 miles above his home planet. Miller struggles to maintain his sanity while in isolation by interacting with Polaroid pictures of former ISS crew members left aboard the ship.

When the station has some power glitches, Miller journeys into an unpressurised module of the space station to perform repairs and discovers the 1864 journal of Briggs. Miller reads Briggs's account of the war and becomes enthralled by the mysterious object he is searching for, not realizing he will soon become more familiar with the very same object, and not by accident.

In 2045, six years after losing contact with CAPCOM and with a failing oxygen system inside the ISS, Miller puts on a space suit and goes for a spacewalk, deciding that it would be easier for him to detach his tether and slowly drift towards Earth and to burn in the atmosphere than slowly suffocate to death on board the ISS. He finds, however, that he is unable to go through with his suicide.

Miller is seen still aboard the ISS, presumably much later: his hair has grown extremely long, and he is extensively tattooed. He has drawn sketches of people and battles of the Civil War from the journal all over the interior of the ISS. The cramped quarters of the space station have become a rat's nest symbolic of his diminished sanity. He then seems to be contacted from outside the ISS, and to receive instructions to dock and transfer over. He does so, and seems to arrive in a giant uninhabited structure of distinctly human making. It is unclear whether this is real or imagined by Miller, who is now insane.

Miller wanders around until he happens upon a server mainframe where he finds a book titled A Love Story' As Told by 'You. Inside this book, he finds pictures of Captain Lee Briggs with his discovery, a gigantic cube-like alien object that may have helped advance Human society. In the index of the book, Miller finds a reference to himself and types it into the computer prompt. He then finds himself inside a generic hotel room, where a disembodied voice says:

During the speech, we see the same cube-like object in space in the year 2045. The viewer is left to assume that this object has 'obtained' Lee Miller and is speaking directly to him. The film ends with the voice of a computer speaking of human connections and love.

Production

The space station set was built in William Eubank's parents' backyard. In a making-of video uploaded to his Vimeo account, Eubank details the construction of the set and lists materials such as packing quilts, MDF, pizza bags, Velcro, insulation, Christmas lights, and other salvaged material as components to the ISS set. According to Tom DeLonge, the production was going to rent the space station from another movie but instead opted to construct it from salvaged materials for budget reasons.

Early teasers were released in 2007 and 2009. On January 10, 2011, the film's final trailer was released on Apple Trailers. The release of this trailer saw coverage on several industry websites.

Release

Festival circuit

The film's world premiere took place on February 2, 2011, at the 26th Annual Santa Barbara International Film Festival, with additional screenings on February 3, 4 and 5 at the Metro 4 and Arlington Theater. The film was screened for free on February 11 at the Riviera Theatre in Santa Barbara as one of eleven films chosen as "Best of the Fest".

The 2011 Seattle International Film Festival featured Love in both their Sci-Fi and Beyond Pathway and their New American Cinema program. The film played on May 21 at the Pacific Place Theatre and May 22 at the SIFF Cinema. The film played a third time, June 11, at the Egyptian Theatre.

Love was accepted into the 2011 Fantasia International Film Festival held in Montreal, Quebec. Its FanTasia screening on July 18 in Hall Theatre, as part of the festival's Camera Lucida Section, marked the film's international premiere. The film also screened in Athens, Lund, London, Nantes, South Korea, Spain, Israel, and elsewhere.

Limited release

Love was shown nationwide  on August 10, 2011.

Home media
Angels & Airwaves released a box set containing Love, the soundtrack to the film, Love Part I, and the band's fourth studio album Love Part II on November 8, 2011.

Reception
At the Santa Barbara International Film Festival, the film was originally slotted for three showings but two additional showings in the Arlington Theatre were added after some original showings sold out.

Dennis Harvey, for Variety, wrote "[The film's] spiritual abstruseness and the script's myriad other ambiguities might infuriate in a film less ingeniously designed on more tangible fronts. But Love delights with the detail of its primary set as well as in accomplished effects, consistently interesting yet subservient soundtrack textures (the sole original song is reserved for the closing-credit crawl) and a brisk editorial pace ..."

Dustin Hucks, for Ain't It Cool News, wrote "Love can at times get very broad with scenes, dialogue, and flow ... if you're keen on clarity and the linear, Love is going to leave you frustrated. For others, however, – the challenge of understanding what is what may lead to a desire for repeat viewings, which for me – is a lot of fun ... This is a film that's clearly not for everyone – but has a lot to offer the Inception and Moon crowds."

Hucks continued to say Love was one of the most visually exciting low-budget films he had seen in some time and concluded with an overall endorsement: "Love is well worth seeking out in theaters – but don't miss it on DVD if you don't get the opportunity to view it in theaters."

See also
 Apollo 13, a 1995 film dramatizing the Apollo 13 incident
 Gravity, 2013 3D science-fiction space drama film
 Moon, a 2009 British science fiction drama film 
 List of films featuring space stations

References

External links

 
 
 
 Love at the iTunes Preview
  

2011 science fiction films
2011 films
American Civil War films
American science fiction drama films
Dying Earth (genre)
Films about astronauts
Films set in 1864
Films set in 2039
Films set in 2045
Films set in the future
Films shot in California
American post-apocalyptic films
American space adventure films
Human extinction
Films directed by William Eubank
2011 directorial debut films
2010s English-language films
2010s American films